Lorenzo Adorni (born 1 December 1998) is an Italian professional footballer who plays as a right back for Fossano in Serie D.

Club career
On 31 January 2019, Gubbio announced that he will join the club on loan. However, the league was not satisfied with the paperwork filed by Gubbio, and he had to return to Monza and finish the season there.

On 17 July 2019, he signed a 2-year contract with Vis Pesaro. On 31 January 2020, he moved to Imolese on loan until the end of the season. On 24 February 2021, his contract was terminated by mutual consent.

Honours

Club 
 Monza
Serie D: 2016-17
Scudetto Dilettanti: 2016-17

References

External links

1998 births
Living people
Italian footballers
Sportspeople from Parma
Association football fullbacks
Parma Calcio 1913 players
A.C. Monza players
Vis Pesaro dal 1898 players
Imolese Calcio 1919 players
Serie C players
Serie D players
Footballers from Emilia-Romagna